The Coolumbooka River, a perennial river of the Snowy River catchment, is located in the Monaro region of New South Wales, Australia.

Course and features
The river flows generally west southwest, joined by one minor tributary before reaching its confluence with the Bombala River near the town of Bombala. The river descends  over its  course, flowing through the northern boundary of the Coolumbooka Nature Reserve.

The river is impounded by Coolumbooka Weir that provides water supply to the town of Bombala.

See also

 Rivers of New South Wales
 List of rivers of New South Wales (A-K)
 List of rivers of Australia

References

Rivers of New South Wales